West Aitape Rural LLG is a local-level government (LLG) of Sandaun Province, Papua New Guinea. The Piore River languages and Oceanic languages such as Sissano are spoken in the LLG.

Sissano Lagoon is located in the LLG.

Wards
01. Nimas
02. Manyer (Sissano)
03. Maindroin (Sissano)
04. Paupa (Bauni speakers)
05. Moriri
06. Arop 1 (Arop speakers)
07. Arop 2 (Arop speakers)
08. Mainyen (Malol speakers)
09. Tanyapin
10. Aipokon
11. Nengian
12. Koiniri
13. Walwale
14. Rome
15. Barera
16. Kaiye
17. Mafoka
18. Mori
19. Mumuru
20. Sumo (Bouni  speakers)
21. Ramo (Uni speakers)
22. Pou
23. Sarai (Sera speakers)
24. Rainuk
25. Amsuku

References

Local-level governments of Sandaun Province